The Serbian Signal Brigade is a main unit of Serbian Armed Forces responsible for the military communications (signals). It is under direct command of General Staff.

History
The brigade was formed on 30 October 2006 by merging the former 389th Signal Brigade and 235th Stationary Signal Unit.

Tasks
The main task of the brigade is establishing and maintaining the stationary signal systems on the whole territory of the country. It provides joint command over the signalling system of Serbia.

Structure
Signal Brigade consists of command platoon and 4 battalions which are based in garrisons and detached establishments all over the country.

 Command platoon
 1st Signal Battalion
 2nd Signal Battalion
 3rd Signal Battalion
 4th Signal Battalion

References

External links
 Signal Brigade Web Page

Brigades of Serbia
Serbia
Military units and formations of the Serbian General Staff
Military units and formations established in 2006